Cocker Bar railway station was located in what is still open country where Cocker Bar Road (B5248) crosses what is now the Ormskirk Branch Line.

The station was closed when Midge Hall station opened  further north in 1859, shortly after the line was taken over by the Lancashire and Yorkshire Railway.

History

In August 1859 the ELR was amalgamated with the Lancashire and Yorkshire Railway (LYR), and in October that year, the station at Midge Hall was opened. Sources differ slightly on distances. The Engineers' Line Reference data for line FCO separates the sites by 47 chains. Looking at the maps it would appear that Marshall's figure is rounded.

Reopening proposals
There have been talks amongst the local community for the possible reopening of Midge Hall station, which was closed in 1961. Cocker Bar's site is green field, on a locally well connected B road and near Wymott and Garth prisons.

References

Sources

External links
The station on an old OS Map via Old OS Maps
The line and mileages via railwaycodes

Disused railway stations in Chorley
Former Lancashire and Yorkshire Railway stations
Railway stations in Great Britain opened in 1849
Railway stations in Great Britain closed in 1859
1849 establishments in England